Miss World USA 1972 was the 11th edition of the Miss World USA pageant and it was held in Hampton, Virginia and was won by Lynda Jean Córdoba Carter of Arizona. She was crowned by outgoing titleholder, Karen Brucene Smith of Texas. Carter went on to represent the United States at the Miss World 1972 Pageant in London later that year. She finished in the Top 15 at Miss World.

Results

Placements

Special awards

Delegates
The Miss World USA 1972 delegates were:

 Alabama - Joan. S. Turner
 Alaska - Rhonda Rae Dodds
 Arizona - Lynda Jean Córdoba Carter
 California - Rochelle A. Wallace
 Colorado - Dianne McDonough
 Connecticut - Gloria Marie Beze
 Delaware - Sallie "Becky" Matthews
 District of Columbia - Monica Metrinko
 Florida -  Sandra Leland
 Georgia - Melanie Ann Chapman
 Hawaii - Sharlene Annette Ann Angeli Silva
 Idaho - Robynn Gail Hance
 Illinois - Monika Kelier
 Iowa - Schuyler Quick
 Kansas - Victoria Ann Meyers
 Kentucky - Frances Lynn Adams
 Louisiana - Teresa "Terry" Ann Richard
 Maine - Susanne Anderson
 Maryland - Pia Nancy Canzani
 Massachusetts - Janice Janes
 Michigan - Karen R. Kistier
 Minnesota - Johnelle Foley
 Missouri - Kali Ball
 Nebraska - Rebecca Shaaf
 Nevada - Trenna V. Gulbransen
 New Hampshire - Judy Tedeschi
 New Jersey - Andrea McLaughlin
 New Mexico - Karen Jenson
 New York - Michelle Renee Franqui
 North Carolina - Julia Ann Lane
 North Dakota - G. Jill Duis
 Ohio - Vicki Lane Hess
 Oklahoma - Rita Jo Fitzgerald
 Oregon - Jojuan Lyn Tussing
 Pennsylvania - Brenda L. Wrona
 Rhode Island - Nancy Zinna
 South Carolina - Faye M. Breland
 Tennessee - Cythnia Greer Baily
 Texas - Jackie Behrendt
 Utah - Pam Ure
 Vermont - Pati Papineau
 Virginia - Marie Ann Hunderleiter
 Washington - Debra Kelley
 Wisconsin - Barbara Jean Jennings
 Wyoming - Barbara M. Duennebeil

Notes

Did not Compete

Crossovers
Contestants who competed in other beauty pageants:

Miss International
1973: : Pia Nancy Canzani (as )

Miss World America
1973: : Rhonda Rae Dodds
1973: : Trenna V. Gulbransen

References

External links
Miss World Official Website
Miss World America Official Website

1972 in the United States
World America
1972
1972 in Virginia